Agua Poca is a monogenetic volcano in the Puelén Department of Argentina.  The volcano has the form of a cinder cone and has been active in the Pleistocene.

Accessibility

Unpaved roads lead to the volcano itself.

Geography

Agua Poca lies in the western La Pampa Province, close to the boundary with Mendoza province. Two other volcanoes, Del Nido and Escorial/Amarillo are nearby.

Geology

The volcanism in the Agua Poca area began as fissure eruptions that released large amounts of liquid lavas, forming Agua Poca, El Escorial, Payun Matru and other volcanoes.

Agua Poca has erupted basalt lava. Bisceglia (1977) assumed that Agua Poca, together with the neighbouring volcanoes Del Nido and Escorial/Amarillo, is the origin of the El Puente basalt formation. Later, Linares et al (1980) assumed that these basalts originated in volcanoes of the Mendoza province with little input from these three volcanoes. The volcano itself has an easily recognizable crater, but part of the volcano's flanks has been subject to gully erosion. The cone is constructed from alternating layers of cinder and spatter and contains ultramafic xenoliths. There are two subsidiary structures, Cherro Chico and Loma Sur of small dimensions. Chemically, the lavas of Agua Poca are intra-plate alkali basalts, with some lavas transitioning in tholeiite.

Various geologists have attributed varying ages to these volcanoes, ranging from Pliocene to Holocene. The volcano was active in the Pleistocene, with K-Ar dating indicating an age of 0.6±1 Ma. There have been numerous phases of volcanic activity in the region until recent times, with Agua Poca belonging to the Puente Group given stratigraphic and radiometric data. Activity was strombolian in nature with the formation of Pele's tears and lava bombs and was likely monogenetic in nature. A fault system running through the edifice possibly controlled the activity of this volcano.

Given the small magma output of this volcano, it's likely the tunnel is unrelated to Agua Poca.

References

Volcanoes of Argentina
Volcanoes of La Pampa Province
Andean Volcanic Belt